Crime Dog may refer to:

 Fred McGriff (born 1963), American baseball player 
 McGruff the Crime Dog, fictional character in television public-service announcements & other media
 "Crime Dog", episode of television series Wonderfalls